Xavier College Preparatory is a Catholic, all-female private high school in Phoenix, Arizona, United States. It is located in the Roman Catholic Diocese of Phoenix, drawing students from 120 local schools.

History
Xavier High School was founded in 1943 by the Jesuit Fathers of St. Francis Xavier Parish and the Sisters of Charity of the Blessed Virgin Mary. Originally located on the campus of Brophy College Preparatory, the school moved into Fitzgerald hall on its current campus in the spring of 1953. More buildings have been added as the school has grown. The school was granted College Preparatory status in 1982 and changed its name to Xavier College Preparatory.

Today, Xavier has over 1,200 students. While the school remains all-female, students at Xavier share many classes with students from Brophy College Preparatory, the all-male Jesuit high school that is adjacent to Xavier. All leadership positions in the administration and student body are filled by women.

Academics
Xavier follows a traditional college preparatory curriculum. Students are required to take classes in English, Mathematics, Catholic Theology, Social Studies, Laboratory Sciences, World Languages, Fine Arts and Physical Education as well as half a semester of Computer Programming. 46 Honors classes are available in all fields of study, and 27 Advanced Placement Classes are available to students in grades 9–12. All seniors are required to take AP Literature. There is also a service requirement for all juniors. Students were permitted to take classes at Brophy College Preparatory however, this is no longer the case. Dual Enrollment is available through Rio Salado College  and most classes offer dual credit.

In the past 10 years, the school has congratulated 89 National Merit Finalists, 143 Commended Scholars, 36 National Hispanic Scholars, and five National Black American Scholars. Xavier students have been designated Presidential Scholars in 1979, 1986, 1990, 2001, 2008, and 2014; Presidential Scholar Semi-Finalists in 1975, 1993, and 2014; and Flinn Scholars in 2004, 2014, 2016, and 2019. In the 1990–91, 1994–96, and 2013–14 school years it was honored as a Blue Ribbon school.

Athletics
Xavier has numerous sports teams including teams in cross country, track, crew, golf, tennis, badminton, cheer, pom, swim/dive, soccer, volleyball, sand volleyball, basketball, softball, archery, shotgun, and eSports.

Xavier Spiritline cheer won the USA national championship in 2017. Xavier Spiritline pom got second place in the USA national championship in 2017. Xavier also fields championship golf, badminton, swim/dive, cross country, volleyball, basketball, soccer, track and softball teams as well as active club teams in crew, lacrosse, and shooting sports.

Xavier Swim team has won more state championships than any other high school in Arizona with 27 state titles since 1985.

Student life
Xavier High School has over 80 clubs available to students including three publications and multiple honors societies, including a Computer Science Honor Society. They also have an extensive theatre program and many opportunities to travel abroad for both study and service.

Honor societies
Xavier was the first high school in the state of Arizona to found a chapter of the Computer Science Honor Society. The induction of its founding members occurred on August 28, 2019. The Computer Science Department was inspired  by Sister Mary Kenneth Keller, BVM, who was one of the first two Americans to earn a PhD in Computer Science  and a member of the same order of nuns, the Sisters of Charity of the Blessed Virgin Mary, which has run Xavier since its founding in 1943. The Xavier Computer Science Honor Society also offers many opportunities for young women to become more involved in STEAM. One of the Society's biggest events of the year is Girls Have IT Day. Girls Have IT is run by members of the Xavier Computer Science Honor Society, and invites middle school girls from all across the Valley to gain more knowledge about STEAM subjects through a series of booths and hands-on activities set up around the Xavier campus that are run by Xavier students. The middle school girls who attend Girls Have IT Day enjoy learning about STEAM from their "near-peer" instructors, and after coming to the event, 90% of the attendees are inspired to work harder in school.

Notable alumnae
 Betsey Bayless, Secretary of State of Arizona
 Amanda Blumenherst, professional golfer
 Aidy Bryant, actress and comedian
 Jeanne Collier, diver and Olympic medalist
 Heather Farr, professional golfer
 Stacey Ferreira, entrepreneur, speaker, and author
 Khalia Lanier, volleyball player 
 Lois Maffeo, musician
 Meghan McCain, news commentator
 Grace Park, professional golfer
 Loret Miller Ruppe, U.S. ambassador and director of the Peace Corps
 Emma Stone, actress
 Cheyenne Woods, professional golfer

References

External links
 Official school website

High schools in Phoenix, Arizona
Catholic secondary schools in Arizona
Catholic Church in Arizona
Educational institutions established in 1944
1944 establishments in Arizona
Girls' schools in Arizona